Michael Honaker (born November 11, 1965) is an American politician serving as a member of the West Virginia House of Delegates from the 46th district. Appointed by Governor Jim Justice in December 2021, he assumed office on January 4, 2022.

Early life and education 
Honaker was born in Union, West Virginia. He earned a Bachelor of Science degree in criminal justice from Bluefield College.

Career 
From 1984 to 1988, Honaker served in the United States Marine Corps, where he was assigned to the III Marine Expeditionary Force. He joined the Virginia State Police in 1989, serving as a trooper until 1995, a field sergeant until 2001, special agent in charge of criminal investigations, and field commander until 2017. He also worked as an investigator for a private intelligence company. Since 2018, he has served as director of homeland security and emergency management for Greenbrier County, West Virginia. Honaker was appointed to the West Virginia House of Delegates in December 2021, succeeding Barry Bruce.

References 

Living people
People from Union, West Virginia
People from Monroe County, West Virginia
Bluefield College alumni
Republican Party members of the West Virginia House of Delegates
American law enforcement officials
1965 births